Anne+ is a 2018 Dutch drama television series that premiered on BNNVARA and 3LAB on 30 September 2018. Set in Amsterdam, it follows the love life of Anne, a twenty four year-old lesbian. The series is created by Maud Wiemeijer, Valerie Bisscheroux, and Hanna van Vliet, and produced by Millstreet Films.

Plot

In season 1, as Anne "moves into her own place she unexpectedly runs into her ex-girlfriend Lily. Lily was her first girlfriend and a lot has happened since they broke up four years ago. Over the weekend, Anne reflects on the relationships she has had throughout her student years in Amsterdam. In six episodes we learn about Anne’s turbulent love life and how these diverse girls and various relationships have contributed to who she is today".

In season 2, "Anne seems to have things going for her; she has a job at a creative agency, plenty of close friends, she is dating a lovely girl and lives in a great apartment in the city center of Amsterdam. But still she is restless. She wants a career change, but doesn’t know where to start and constantly keeps being distracted. Especially when all of a sudden an ex-girlfriend is standing on her doorstep, while she is already having trouble with a different ex. Her parents apparently have their own stuff to deal with, so she can’t count on them to help her out. And her friends seem to have other things on their mind then what is going on with Anne. Also, she should really start doing something about those bills pilling up on her kitchen table. This grown up life turns out to be something other than she expected. How are you supposed to balance friends, work and relationships?"

Cast and characters

Main
 Hanna van Vliet as Anne
 Eline van Gils as Lily

Recurring

 Jade Olieberg as Jip  
 Amy van der Weerden as Daantje  
 Flip Zonne Zuijderland as Doris  
 Alex Hendrickx as Casper  
 Huib Cluistra as Teun  
 Jouman Fattal as Sara  
 Jacqueline Blom as Liesbeth  
 Hein van der Heijden as Jos  
 Jesse Mensah as Max  
 Valentijn Benard as Oscar  
 Myrthe Huber as Caro  
 Ayla Satijn as Maya  
 Laura Gómez as Cecilia

Guest

 Gale Rama as Liv  
 Niels Gooijer as Mark  
 Sharai Rodrigues as Janna  
 Djamila Landbrug as Sofie  
 Dorian Bindels as Daniël  
 Kirsten Mulder as Esther  
 Sarah Janneh as Lotte  
 Joy Wielkens as Noa  
 Ernesto Dennis as Gastheer  
 Marloes Ijpelaar as Maaike  
 Jetty Mathurin as Barbara  
 Rick Paul van Mulligen as Ralph  
 Lieke-Rosa Altink as Makelaar  
 Juda Goslinga as Henk  
 Urmie Plein as Naomi  
 Ayrton Fraenk as Milan  
 Olivier van Klaarbergen as Yoeri  
 Anne Chris Schulting as Stella

Background and production
The story was conceived by Maud Wiemeijer in 2015, who worked on it with director Valerie Bisscheroux. The two also worked on it with actor Hanna van Vliet. The series was initially funded using crowdfunding. Season 1 consists of 6 episodes, each one approximately 12 minutes. Season 2 includes 8 episodes, each approximately 24 minutes long.

British television network Channel 4 bought the rights of Anne+ from Millstreet Films on 29 January 2020, for streaming on Walter Presents, in the UK and was made available on the platform in June 2020.

Release
Anne+ was introduced at the Netherlands Film Festival, before premiering on 3LAB, the online platform of NPO 3, and on BNNVARA. The first season was released on 30 September 2018. The second season was released on 3 March 2020.

It had its North American premiere at the 2019 Tribeca Film Festival. The series was planned to be released on YouTube in 2018; however, it was postponed and the first season became available in January 2020.

Film

In March 2021, the first two seasons appeared on Netflix in the Benelux. It was also announced that a movie will be released later this year. The film became available internationally on Netflix after its theatrical release. The film features actor Thorn Roos de Vries as the first non-binary character in a Dutch movie.

References

External links
 
  Anne+ at BNNVARA 
  Anne+ at 3LAB
 

Dutch web series
2018 web series debuts
2018 Dutch television series debuts
2010s Dutch television series
Drama web series
Dutch drama television series
Lesbian-related television shows
LGBT-related web series
Television shows set in Amsterdam
Dutch-language television shows
2010s LGBT-related television series
NPO 3 original programming